SAS: Are You Tough Enough was a British television documentary series produced from 2002-2004 exposing volunteer members of the public to the experience of the British Army's Special Air Service's selection process. It was presented by Dermot O'Leary. In contrast to the real SAS, the programme also featured female candidates. As with real selection, initially the candidates were pushed to the limits to reduce the numbers, with survivors in the latter stages, trained and assessed in a variety of military training exercises.

The contestants participated in exercises experienced in the real selection process, although over a shorter time frame, with the winner only getting a hand-shake from the ex-SAS SSgt Eddie Stone. For realism, exercises were controlled by ex-members of the SAS, notably Staff Sergeant Eddie Stone and John McAleese with additional comments about what would happen in the real process from other ex-SAS members.

There were three series: the original in the Scottish Highlands, the SAS Jungle in Borneo, and SAS Desert in Namibia.

Series 1 - Highlands
In the first series, the exercises included:

 The Fan Dance over Ben Lomond — five eliminated 
 The Long Drag (a 40 mile trek with a 55 lb bergen to be completed in 20 hours) — eight eliminated, including four for medical reasons and one for cheating  
 Escape and evasion, with a resulting interrogation test — six eliminated 
 Fitness test
 Swimming test (fully clothed in combat gear) — two eliminated 
 Survival
 Free fall parachuting
 Navigation
 Off road driving in a Land Rover Defender 110
 Marksmanship
 Close quarters reconnaissance of a farmhouse
 Fieldcraft and infantry tactics in an assault
 A booby trapped outdoor close quarters battle course, 10 targets and 30 rounds of ammunition
 Assault of a Killing House

The 29 contestants participated in an 11-day course, sleeping in tents when not on specific overnight/survival exercises. The majority failed to complete the course, retiring in the early stages on medical grounds or due to being unwilling to continue, and in latter stages due to failing to meet the required standard. One woman, Louise Rickard, made it into the final four who completed the course, with the winner selected as Gary Robertson from Dundee.

See also
Special Forces: Ultimate Hell Week (2015-2017)
SAS: Who Dares Wins (2015-)

References

External links
 SAS: Are you tough enough at imdb.com
 BBC Feature, experience of one of the contestants
 UKTV SAS: Are You Tough Enough? page
 New Zealand Television, SAS Desert in Namibia page

British reality television series
Works about the Special Air Service
British military television series